Big Deal at Gothenburg is a 1966 British documentary film directed by Robert Tyrrell for Tyne Tees TV.

Awards

References

External links 
 Big Deal at Gothenburg at British Film Institute

British television documentaries
1966 documentary films
1966 films
1966 television films
1960s English-language films
1960s British films